This is a list of bridges on the National Register of Historic Places in the U.S. state of New Hampshire.

Current listings

Former listing

See also

List of covered bridges in New Hampshire

Notes

References

 
New Hampshire
Bridges
Bridges